The 1991 eruption of Mount Pinatubo in the Philippines' Luzon Volcanic Arc was the second-largest volcanic eruption of the 20th century, behind only the 1912 eruption of Novarupta in Alaska.  Eruptive activity began on April 2 as a series of phreatic explosions from a fissure that opened on the north side of Mount Pinatubo. Seismographs were set up and began monitoring the volcano for earthquakes. In late May, the number of seismic events under the volcano fluctuated from day-to-day. Beginning June 6, a swarm of progressively shallower earthquakes accompanied by inflationary tilt on the upper east flank of the mountain, culminated in the extrusion of a small lava dome.

On June 12, the volcano’s first spectacular eruption sent an ash column  into the atmosphere. Additional explosions occurred overnight and the morning of June 13. Seismic activity during this period became intense. When even more highly gas-charged magma reached Pinatubo's surface on June 15, the volcano exploded, sending an ash cloud  into the atmosphere. Volcanic ash and pumice blanketed the countryside.

Fine ash from the eruption fell as far away as the Indian Ocean and satellites tracked the ash cloud as it traveled several times around the globe. At least 16 commercial jets inadvertently flew through the drifting ash cloud, sustaining about $100 million in damage. With the ashfall came darkness and the sounds of lahars rumbling down nearby river valleys. Several smaller lahars washed through the Clark Air Base, flowing across the base in enormously powerful sheets, slamming into buildings and scattering cars. Nearly every bridge within  of Mount Pinatubo was destroyed. Several lowland towns were flooded or partially buried in mud. More than 840 people were killed from the collapse of roofs under wet heavy ash and several more were injured.

Rain continued to create hazards over the next several years, as the volcanic deposits were remobilized into secondary mudflows. Damage to bridges, irrigation-canal systems, roads, cropland, and urban areas occurred in the wake of each significant rainfall. Many more people were affected for much longer by rain-induced lahars than by the eruption itself.

Build-up and evacuations

On July 16, 1990, a magnitude 7.7 earthquake struck northern Central Luzon and the Cordilleras. This was the largest earthquake recorded in 1990, comparable in size to the 1906 San Francisco earthquake and the 2008 Sichuan earthquake.

Two weeks after the earthquake, local residents reported steam coming from the volcano, but scientists who visited there in response found only small rockslides rather than any pre-eruptive activity. On March 15, 1991, a succession of earthquakes were felt by villagers on the northwestern side of the volcano. Further earthquakes of increasing intensity were felt over the next two weeks, and it became clear some kind of volcanic activity was likely.

Over the next few weeks, small eruptions continued, dusting the surrounding areas with volcanic ash. Seismographs recorded hundreds of small earthquakes every day. Scientists immediately installed monitoring equipment and analyzed the volcano for clues as to its previous eruptive history. Radiocarbon dating of charcoal found in old volcanic deposits revealed the last three major explosive eruption periods in recent millennia, about 5500, 3500 and 500 years ago. Geological mapping showed that much of the surrounding plains were formed by lahar flood deposits from previous eruptions.

Volcanic activity increased throughout May. This implied that there was a rising column of fresh magma beneath the volcano. After May 28, the amount of  being emitted decreased substantially, raising fears that the degassing of the magma had been blocked somehow, leading to a pressure build-up in the magma chamber and a high likelihood of violent explosive eruptions.

In early June, tiltmeter measurements had shown that the volcano was gradually inflating, evidently due to fast-growing amounts of magma filling the reservoir beneath the summit. Such an event is a precursor of volcano tectonic earthquakes.

Given all the signs that a very large eruption was imminent, the Philippine Institute of Volcanology and Seismology – assisted by the United States Geological Survey – worked to convince local inhabitants of the high severity of the threat. A false warning might have led to cynicism about any later warnings, but delaying a warning until an eruption began might lead to thousands of deaths, so the volcanologists were under some pressure to deliver a timely and accurate assessment of the volcanic risk.

The  and  zones had a total population of about 40,000 inhabitants, while some more 331,000 inhabitants lived in the  zone.

Five stages of volcanic alert were defined, from level 1 (low level seismic disturbances) up to level 5 (major eruption in progress). Daily alerts were issued stating the alert level and associated danger area, and the information was announced in major regional and national newspapers, on radio and television stations, by nongovernmental organizations (NGOs) and directly to the endangered inhabitants.

They moved to increasingly distant settlements as the eruptions escalated, some Aetas moving up to nine times in the two months before the colossal eruption.
The first formal evacuations were ordered for the  zone on April 7. Evacuation of the  zone was ordered when a level 4 alert was issued on June 7. A level 5 alert triggered evacuation of the  zone on June 13, and in all some 60,000 people had left the area within  of the volcano before June 15. Most people temporarily relocated to Metro Manila, with some 30,000 using the Amoranto Velodrome in Quezon City as an evacuee camp.

On June 7, the first magmatic eruptions took place with the formation of a lava dome at the summit of the volcano.

Escalation of eruption

A small blast at 03:41 PST on June 12 marked the beginning of a new, more violent phase of the eruption. Friction in the up-rushing ash column generated abundant volcanic lightning.

A third large eruption began at 08:41 on June 13, after an intense swarm of small earthquakes over the previous two hours. It lasted about five minutes, and the eruption column once again reached .

Tephra fall from these four large eruptions was extensive to the southwest of the volcano. Two hours after the last of these four explosions, a series of eruptions began which lasted for the next twenty-four hours, and which saw the production of much larger pyroclastic flows and surges which travelled several kilometres down river valleys on the flanks of the volcano.

Dacite was the dominant igneous rock making up the tephra in these eruptions and in the following climactic event. The most abundant phenocryst minerals were hornblende and plagioclase, but an unusual phenocryst mineral was also present – the calcium sulfate called anhydrite. The dacite magma was more oxidized than most magmas, and the sulfur-rich nature of the eruption was probably causally related to the redox state.

The final, climactic eruption of Mount Pinatubo began at 13:42 PST on June 15.

All the seismographs close to Clark Air Base had been rendered completely inoperative by 14:30, mostly by super-massive pyroclastic surges. Intense atmospheric pressure variation was also recorded.

Typhoon rains and flooding, mixed with the ash deposits, caused a messy rain of mud and massive lahars.

Almost all of the island received some wet ash fall, which formed a heavy, rain-saturated snow-like blanket. Tephra fell over most of the South China Sea and ash falls were recorded as far away as Vietnam, Cambodia, Singapore, Malaysia and Indonesia.

Twelve days after the first magmatic eruptions of June 3, on June 15, 1991, by about 22:30, and about nine hours after the onset of the most recent climactic phase, atmospheric pressure waves had decreased to the pre-eruption levels. No seismic records were available at this time, but volcanologists believe 22:30 PST marked the end of the climactic eruption.

Vast quantities of light and heavy metal minerals were brought to the surface.

Effects on aircraft 

At least 16 commercial aircraft had damaging in-flight encounters with the ash cloud ejected by the June 15 eruption, and many grounded aircraft were also significantly damaged. In-flight encounters caused loss of power to one engine on each of the two aircraft. Ten engines were damaged and replaced, including all three engines of one DC-10. Longer-term damage to aircraft and engines was reported, including accumulation of sulfate deposits on engines. The eruption also irreparably damaged the Philippine Air Force's recently retired fleet of Vought F-8s, as these were in open storage at Basa Air Base at the time.

Aftermath

Explosivity of the eruption
The 1991 eruption rated 6 on the Volcanic Explosivity Index and came some 450–500 years after the volcano's last known eruptive activity.

Death toll
A reported 847 people were killed by the eruption, mostly by roofs collapsing under a load of accumulated volcanic matter, a hazard amplified by the simultaneous arrival of Typhoon Yunya.

The evacuation in the days before the eruption certainly saved tens of thousands of lives, and has been hailed as a great success for volcanology and eruption prediction.

After the eruption, about 500,000 people continue to live within  of the volcano, with population centers including the 150,000 in Angeles City and 30,000 at Clark Freeport Zone.

Effects on agriculture

Many reforestation projects were destroyed in the eruption, with a total area of  valued at 125 million pesos destroyed. The cost to agriculture of eruption effects was estimated to be 1.5 billion pesos.

Many farmers near Pinatubo began growing quick-ripening crops such as peanuts, cassava, and sweet potatoes, which could be harvested before the threat of lahar floods during the late summer rainy season.

Local economic and social effects
In total, 364 communities and 2.1 million people were affected by the eruption, with livelihoods and houses being damaged and destroyed. More than 8,000 houses were destroyed, and a further 73,000 were damaged. In addition to the severe damage sustained by these communities, roads and communications were damaged or destroyed by pyroclastic surges and lahar floods throughout the areas surrounding the volcano. Total losses in 1991 and 1992 alone were estimated at 10.6 and 1.2 billion pesos respectively, including damage to public infrastructure estimated at 3.8 billion pesos (c. US$92 million, or $175 million today, adjusted for inflation). School classes for thousands of children was temporarily suspended by the destruction of schools in the eruption.

The eruption of Pinatubo severely hampered the economic development of the surrounding areas. The gross regional domestic product of the Pinatubo area accounted for about 10% of the total Philippine gross domestic product. The GRDP had been growing at 5% annually before the eruption but fell by more than 3% from 1990 to 1991. In 1991, damage to crops and property was estimated at $374 million (or $711 million today), to which continuing lahar floods added a further $69 million (or $127 million today) in 1992. In total, 42 percent of the cropland around the volcano was affected by more lahar floods, dealing a severe blow to the agricultural economy in the region.

Lahars
Since the eruption, each heavy rain has brought massive lahars from the volcano, displacing thousands of people and inflicting extensive damage to buildings and infrastructure costing billions to repair. Funds were spent constructing dikes and dams to control post-eruption lahar flows.

Several important river systems stem from Mount Pinatubo, the major rivers being the Tarlac, Abacan, Pasig-Potrero, Sta. Lucia, Bucao, Santo Tomas, Maloma, Tanguay, Ashley and Kileng rivers. Before the eruption, these river systems were important ecosystems, but the eruption filled many valleys with deep pyroclastic deposits. Since 1991, the rivers have been clogged with sediment, and the valleys have seen frequent lahars which continued for years after the eruption. Studies show that the river systems will take decades to recover from the June 1991 eruption.

On September 3, 1995, a lahar buried San Guillermo Parish Church in Bacolor, Pampanga to half its  height.

Military impact 

The United States Air Force initiated a massive airlift effort to evacuate American service members and their families from the two affected bases during and immediately following the eruption, named Operation Fiery Vigil. Each made two passages from Subic Bay transporting evacuees to Cebu City, Mindanao, for subsequent transport by USAF units to Andersen AFB, Guam. Most personnel were initially relocated to Guam, Okinawa and the U.S. state of Hawaii, although some returned to the continental United States. Clark Air Base was ultimately abandoned by the United States military because of the eruption, and Subic Bay reverted to Philippine control in November 1992 following the breakdown of lease negotiations and the expiration of the Military Bases Agreement of 1947.

Global environmental effects
The powerful eruption of such an enormous volume of lava and ash injected significant quantities of aerosols and dust into the stratosphere. Sulfur dioxide oxidized in the atmosphere to produce a haze of sulfuric acid droplets, which gradually spread throughout the stratosphere over the year following the eruption.

This very large stratospheric injection resulted in a volcanic winter, a reduction in the normal amount of sunlight reaching the Earth's surface by roughly 10% (see figure).
The 1991 eruption also caused the "Summer that Wasn't" in 1992.    
 
At the same time, the temperature in the stratosphere rose to several degrees higher than normal, due to the absorption of radiation by the aerosol. The stratospheric cloud from the eruption persisted in the atmosphere for three years. The eruption, while not directly responsible, may have played a part in the formation of the 1993 Storm of the Century.

The eruption had a significant effect on ozone levels in the atmosphere, causing a large increase in the destruction rate of ozone. Ozone levels at middle latitudes reached their lowest recorded levels, while in the Southern Hemisphere winter of 1992, the ozone hole over Antarctica reached its largest ever size until then, with the fastest recorded ozone depletion rates. The eruption of Mount Hudson in Chile in August 1991 also contributed to southern hemisphere ozone destruction, with measurements showing a sharp decrease in ozone levels at the tropopause when the aerosol clouds from Pinatubo and Hudson arrived.
Another noticeable effect of the dust in the atmosphere was the appearance of lunar eclipses. Normally even at mid-eclipse, the moon is still visible although much dimmed, whereas in the year following the Pinatubo eruption, the moon was hardly visible at all during eclipses, due to much greater absorption of sunlight by dust in the atmosphere. It has also been suggested that excess cloud condensation nuclei from the eruption were responsible for the "Great Flood of 1993" in the Midwestern United States.

Aeta people
The Aeta people were the hardest hit by the eruption. After the areas surrounding the volcano were declared safe, many Aetas returned to their old villages only to find them destroyed by pyroclastic and lahar deposits.  Some were able to return to their former way of life, but most moved instead to government-organized resettlement areas. Conditions on these were poor, with each family receiving only small plots of land not ideal for growing crops. Many Aeta found casual labor working for lowland farmers, and overall Aeta society became much more fragmented, and reliant on and integrated with lowland culture.

Humanitarian aid 
Humanitarian aid received due to the eruption is as follows:

Local

Government 
The government implemented several rehabilitative and reconstructive programs. Projects that will help deal with the aftermath brought about by lahar were also implemented. Among these is the construction of mega dikes. Moreover, to hasten the implementation of the basic services for the afflicted, private sectors, including the NGOs, took part in offering relief. They provided support and coordinated on the services that were deemed lacking from the side of the government.

1. Resettlement

2. Livelihood programs focused on agriculture and industry (quick-generating income opportunities to affected families)

3. Basic social services

4. Infrastructure rehabilitation and reconstruction

Asian Disaster Reduction Center 
The Asian Disaster Reduction Center was founded in Kobe, Hyogo prefecture, in 1998, with a mission to improve disaster resilience of its fifty member countries, to build safe communities, and to create a society where there is an achievable sustainable development. The Center works to build and establish networks among countries through many programs such as personnel exchanges in this field. The Center addresses this issue from a global perspective in cooperation with various UN agencies and international organizations including the International Strategy for Disaster Reduction (ISDR), the Office for the Coordination of Humanitarian Affairs (OCHA), the United Nations Educational, Scientific and Cultural Organization (UNESCO), the United Nations Economic and Social Commission for Asia and the Pacific (ESCAP), the World Meteorological Organization (WMO), and the World Health Organization Regional Office for the Western Pacific (WHO/WPRO). The Asian Disaster Reduction Center focuses mainly on the following forms of aid:

Resettlement 
After the eruption, many of the homes were destroyed and many of the areas affected by lahar were deemed uninhabitable. There was need to resettle the people particularly the Aetas and lowlanders. Resettlement for these two needs to take into consideration the factors of their socio-cultural and socioeconomic differences.

Livelihood 
Faced with the destruction of many of the farmlands and the displacement of farmers and other workers the government had to search for a long-term solution to address the issue. Agricultural-based industries were also greatly affected. The closure of Clark Air base also raised an issue of finding short-term livelihoods and the need to use the base lands to cushion the repercussions of the worker's displacement.

Social services 
The destruction brought about by the incident pressured social service sectors to continue their efforts in assisting in terms of health, social welfare, and education. The services offered are not limited to the victims within the evacuation centers but also offered to the others affected. While the event happened during the opening of a school year, classes were needed to be pushed back as school facilities were destroyed. Providing resettlement for the evacuees was also a major concern. Social services were also provided in the prospective resettlement areas to prepare the victims when settling down.

Infrastructure 
Destruction of many infrastructures was mostly due to the wet ash after the explosion. The region's roads, bridges, public buildings, facilities, communication, and structures for river and flood control were some of the great concerns of the government. A need to establish measures for the flash floods and the threat caused by lahar also became an imperative demand to the government.

Land use and environmental management 
The aftereffects of the eruption damaged not only man-made structures but also farmlands, forestlands, and watersheds. River systems and the overall environment of the affected region are also heavily damaged by the heavy lahar flow. To address this careful replanning of the land area region is necessary.

Science and technology 
This event showed the need to engage in scientific studies to reassess the current policies and knowledge on areas with risk of eruption. Studies should also be allocated on a possible application for the ash fall for industrial and commercial purposes. The significance of this concern affects both the government and private sectors.

International 
Even before the Philippine government officially appealed for international assistance, the  Office of U.S. Foreign Disaster Assistance (USAID/OFDA) shipped  shelter material for victims of the floods and lahars in late July 1992. In the following month, they provided $375 000 to be used for relief and rehabilitation projects. The Department of Social Welfare and Development had claimed during an informal donors’ meeting with representatives from mostly international agencies who compose the donor community that the national government was still well-equipped and had sufficient resources to aid the victims. The UN-Disaster Management Team (DMT) and the United Nations’ Department of Humanitarian Affairs/United Nations Disaster Relief Organization (DHA/UNDRO) continued cooperating with the national government to monitor the situation and formulate ideas for further assistance.

It was not until then-President Fidel V. Ramos had declared the affected provinces and areas to be in a state of emergency that the national government officially requested for international assistance and for aid in projects for rehabilitation and relief provisions in the aforementioned areas. In response to this, the DHA/UNDRO reached out to the international community to respond to the appeal, and continued their operations, coordinating with the government.

Among the countries that extended humanitarian relief assistance were Australia, Belgium, Canada, China, Denmark, Finland, France, Germany, India, Indonesia, Italy, Japan, Malaysia, Malta, Myanmar, the Netherlands, New Zealand, Norway, Saudi Arabia, Singapore, South Korea, Spain, Sweden, Thailand, the United Kingdom, and the United States. International organizations including the United Nations Development Programme (UNDP), the Office of the United Nations Disaster Relief Coordinator (UNDRO, predecessor to the current United Nations Office for the Coordination of Humanitarian Affairs or OCHA), the United Nations Children’s Emergency Fund (UNICEF), the World Food Programme (WFP), and the World Health Organization (WHO) also offered assistance. Relief assistance from these organizations and countries were in the form of either cash donation or relief items such as food packs, medicines, and shelter materials.

United Nations 
Contributions made by the different systems of the United Nations (UN) are as follows:

Contributions made by participating countries in the UN are as follows:

Others 
Some specific projects under the auspices of the DPWH, which were made possible by foreign assistance, included:
 ADB-funded Mt. Pinatubo Damage Rehabilitation Project
 German Bank for Reconstruction-funded Mt. Pinatubo Emergency Aide Project
 Japan International Cooperation Agency (JICA)-funded Mt. Pinatubo Relief and Rehab Project
 USAID-funded United States Army Corps of Engineers' Mt. Pinatubo recovery action
 Dutch-funded dredging of the Pasac- Guagua-San Fernando Waterway
 Overseas Economic Cooperation Fund (OECF)-funded Pinatubo Hazard Urgent Mitigation Project
 German Centrum for International Migration (CIM)-funded technical assistance for Mount Pinatubo Emergency-PMO
 JICA-funded grant aid for water supply in Mt. Pinatubo resettlement areas and study on flood and mudflow control for Sacobia Bamban/Abacan Rivers
 IBRD-funded technical assistance for Mt. Pinatubo and Rehabilitation Works
 Swiss Disaster Relief-funded technical assistance for Mt. Pinatubo Rehabilitation
 JBIC Yen Loan Package-funded Pinatubo hazard Urgent Mitigation Project

In popular culture
The eruption is featured in volcano and disaster documentaries:
 The eruption has been a subject of the 1993 PBS Nova episode "In the Path of a Killer Volcano".
 On the 1997 National Geographic documentary Volcano: Nature's Inferno.
 On Philippine TV network ABS-CBN's program Red Alert part of the Pinoy True Stories.
 On GRB Entertainment program Earth's Fury episode "Volcano" aired in 1997, aired on television networks around the world such as The Learning Channel in the United States as Anatomy of Disaster.
 On the 2006 documentary on hypothetical disaster scenarios, Mega Disaster  produced by NHNZ.
 On PBS-ITV program in 1998, Savage Earth in an episode called "Out of the Inferno".
 On the 1996 direct-to-video documentary The Amazing Video Collection: Natural Disasters.
 On the 2010 television special produced by the GMA News and Public Affairs during its 50th anniversary titled Limang Dekada: The GMA News 50th Anniversary Special.
 On the 2003 television special produced by the ABS-CBN News and Current Affairs during its 50th anniversary titled Sa Mata ng Balita.
 The eruption has been an subject of the 2006 television documentary aired on the National Geographic Channel titled Surviving the Eruption at Pinatubo.
The eruption is also mentioned in the disaster film Volcano (1997).
The story of  the eruption as shown in the episode of the ABS-CBN educational program Bayani.

See also

List of volcanoes in the Philippines
List of large volcanic eruptions of the 20th century
List of volcanic eruptions by death toll
Volcanic winter (a recent one having been caused by this eruption)

References

Further reading
 

20th-century volcanic events
VEI-6 eruptions
1991 natural disasters
1991 disasters in the Philippines
Volcanic eruptions in the Philippines
Events that forced the climate
Phreatic eruptions
Plinian eruptions
Explosive eruptions
Phreatomagmatic eruptions
Volcanic winters